"High Lonesome Sound" is a song written and recorded by American country music artist Vince Gill.  It was released in April 1996 as the first single and title track from his album High Lonesome Sound.  The song reached #12 on the Billboard Hot Country Singles & Tracks chart in June 1996 and #1 on the RPM Country Tracks chart in Canada the following month.

At the 39th Grammy Awards, "High Lonesome Sound" won the award for Best Country Collaboration with Vocals and was nominated for Best Country Song.

An alternate version of the song was recorded in a more bluegrass orchestration and backed by Alison Krauss & Union Station.

Critical reception
Deborah Evans Price, of Billboard magazine reviewed the song favorably, saying that the "vibrant and bluegrassy sound of the instruments combined with Gill's stellar vocals create a winning combination."

Chart performance
"High Lonesome Sound" debuted at number 50 on the U.S. Billboard Hot Country Singles & Tracks for the week of April 13, 1996

Year-end charts

References

1996 singles
1996 songs
Vince Gill songs
Songs written by Vince Gill
Song recordings produced by Tony Brown (record producer)
MCA Records singles